Wang Mingshan (born 18 January 1964) is a Chinese politician currently serving as secretary of Xinjiang Uygur Autonomous Regional Political and Legal Affairs Commission since January 2021. He is a member of the standing committee of the CCP Xinjiang Uygur Autonomous Regional Committee, the region's top authority.

Biography
Wang was born in Wuwei, Gansu, on 18 January 1964. In 1982, he entered Xinjiang University, majoring in radio. He worked in Yili Public Security Department after university in 1986, and joined the Chinese Communist Party (CCP) in April 1990. In September 2000, he became deputy chief of Yili Public Security Bureau, rising to chief in February 2004. He was chief of Ürümqi Public Security Bureau in December 2009, and held that office until April 2015, when he was appointed deputy party secretary of Ürümqi and secretary of the Ürümqi Municipal Political and Legal Affairs Commission. He served as executive deputy secretary of Xinjiang Uygur Autonomous Regional Political and Legal Affairs Commission in November 2015, and five years later promoted to the secretary position. He also served as chief of Xinjiang Uygur Autonomous Regional Public Security Department from February 2017 to January 2021, and vice chairman of Xinjiang Uygur Autonomous Region from January 2018 to January 2021.

On 9 July 2020, the United States government imposed Global Magnitsky Human Rights Accountability Act sanctions and visa restrictions against Wang for his connection to similar human rights abuse against the ethnic minorities in Xinjiang.

References

1964 births
Living people
People from Wuwei
Xinjiang University alumni
Jilin University alumni
People's Republic of China politicians from Gansu
Chinese Communist Party politicians from Gansu
People sanctioned under the Magnitsky Act